The Abbott Pierre or Pietro Chanoux (1828 - 9 February 1909) was Benedictine monk in charge of a mountain convent and hospice; he was an amateur botanist who started a garden of alpine plants, still maintained as the Chanousia Alpine Botanical Garden located at located at 2170 meters altitude near Mont Blanc, at the Little St Bernard Pass in France, but maintained by the frontier Italian commune of La Thuile (Aosta Valley).

Biography
Pierre was born in Champorcher in the Val d'Aosta to a poor family of shepherds. In 1845, he began studies in Aosta, soon joining the seminary and ordained in 1855. He entered the Order of Santi Maurizio e Lazzaro, which included a religious, previously militant, but later Benedictine order linked to the Savoy Monarchy, and was initially assigned to Valguiranche until 1859. By 1860 he was named rector of the hospice of Piccolo San Bernardo. There he would erect structures aimed at popularizing the zone and hospice. He made payment for stays voluntary. He added a small astronomic observatory, and collected archeologic and geologic items from the area. But his links to the botanist Lino Vaccari (1873 – 1951), aided his interest in botanical collection and cultivation, in part seeking to increase the ability of these regions to serve agriculture. He also had a Franciscan urging to protect local fauna. He received funds for his botanical garden of Chanousia (founded in 1897) from his religious order and the Ministry of Agriculture. In the last years of his life, he was accused by authorities of fostering illegal smuggling across the frontier. After Chanoux's death, it was directed by Vaccari, who edited some of Chanoux's manuscripts. However, the wars of the twentieth century were not helpful for the garden or hospice.

Hospice at Little Saint Bernard
A hospice on the Italian side of the border, located at 2200 meters above sea level, had been erected at this pass in the 11th century by Bernard de Menthon, later canonized. On the French side of the border are ruins of an Ancient Roman mansio or putative mansion are located just north of the border. South along D1090 is the botanical garden and a small funerary chapel and monument dedicated to Chanoux. The convent, based on the passage now known of Little St Bernard, included a hospice that ministered to pilgrims travelling mainly to Rome. Originally autonomous, the hospice was assigned to the order of the Chamoines (Abbey of Saint-Maurice d'Agaune) in 1466, and by the 19th century to the Order of Saints Maurice and Lazarus. During the Second World War, the hospice was partially destroyed, it was forced to close. It was restored in 1993 with funds and work from religious, community, and public groups from France and Italy. Since 2014, the building again began providing food and lodging, mostly to individuals trekking through the alps.

References

1828 births
1909 deaths
Italian botanists
Italian monks